Leptostylus cineraceus is a species of longhorn beetles of the subfamily Lamiinae. It was described by Henry Walter Bates in 1874, and is known from Honduras, Guatemala, and Costa Rica.

References

Leptostylus
Beetles described in 1874